The French National School of Forestry (École nationale des eaux et forêts, or National School of Water Resources and Forestry), established in Nancy, France, in 1824, was the first national training institute for foresters in France, and a premier early school of forestry in Europe and globally.

In 1964, it was merged into the National School of Rural Engineering, Water Resources and Forestry (École nationale du génie rural, des eaux et des forêts, or ENGREF), which in turn became part of AgroParisTech (Institut des sciences et industries du vivant et de l’environnement, or Paris Institute of Technology for Life, Food and Environmental Sciences) in 2006.

Notable alumni
 Georges Fabre
 James Sykes Gamble
 Augustine Henry
 David Hutchins
 Louis Lavauden
 Charles Lane Poole
 Gifford Pinchot
 Sir David Earnest Hutchins

See also 
 Agro ParisTech
 List of historic schools of forestry

References

External links 
 

Agronomy schools
Forestry education
Engineering universities and colleges in France
Universities and colleges in Nancy, France
Forestry in France
History of forestry education
ParisTech
Educational institutions established in 1824
1824 establishments in France